The New Forest is an area of forest and heathland in England.

New Forest may also refer to:

New Forest coven, an alleged group of witches
New Forest District, a local government district in Hampshire, England
New Forest (UK Parliament constituency), a constituency from 1885 to 1918 and again from 1950 to 1997
New Forest, North Yorkshire, a civil parish in England
New Forest pony, a pony breed of the British Isles
 The Children of the New Forest, a novel by Captain Marryat